Bloody Good Time is a first-person shooter developed by Outerlight and published by Ubisoft for Microsoft Windows and Xbox 360. It was released in October 2010.

The game is a spiritual sequel to The Ship, Outerlight's debut title, with similar but improved gameplay and graphics. It features four various game modes (hunt, elimination, revenge and deathmatch). Up to eight players can play in online matches. There is also an arcade mode which allows the player to play against the AI bots. The title uses Valve's Source engine.

The game takes place on a Hollywood movie set and it features three different maps: beach, casino and horror house. Players can choose one of the eight available B-movie characters (The Surfer, The Beach babe, The Goth, The Bunny girl, The Showgirl, The Clown, The Gambler and The Stoner) and then kill other players with 21 different weapons, including usual guns and other items, such as frying pan or remote-controlled rats. The reception has been lukewarm, with very weak sales, which was attributed to Outerlight's demise.

Reception 

The game received "mixed or average reviews" on both platforms according to the review aggregation website Metacritic.

See also

References

External links 
 
 

2010 video games
First-person shooters
Multiplayer and single-player video games
Source (game engine) games
Ubisoft games
Video games developed in the United Kingdom
Video games set in Nevada
Video games set in the Las Vegas Valley
Windows games
Xbox 360 games
Xbox 360 Live Arcade games